George Hall (c. 1613–1668) was an English bishop.

Life

His father was Joseph Hall. George Hall was born at Waltham Abbey, Essex, and studied at Exeter College, Oxford, where he became a Fellow. He became vicar of Menheniot and in 1641 archdeacon of Cornwall.

Having been deprived of office under the Commonwealth, he became a lecturer at St Bartholomew-by-the-Exchange, and then vicar of St. Botolph's, Aldersgate.

He was appointed to the seventh stall in St George's Chapel, Windsor Castle in 1660 and held this until 1662.

He was appointed bishop of Chester in 1662. He was at the same time rector of Wigan, and archdeacon of Canterbury (from 1660). He died in an accident with a knife.

Notes

1613 births
1668 deaths
Bishops of Chester
Archdeacons of Canterbury
Archdeacons of Cornwall
Accidental deaths in England
Canons of Windsor
Alumni of Exeter College, Oxford